The enzyme octopamine dehydratase catalyzes the chemical reaction

1-(4-hydroxyphenyl)-2-aminoethanol  (4-hydroxyphenyl)acetaldehyde + NH3

This enzyme belongs to the family of lyases, specifically the hydro-lyases, which cleave carbon-oxygen bonds.  The systematic name of this enzyme class is 1-(4-hydroxyphenyl)-2-aminoethanol hydro-lyase [deaminating (4-hydroxyphenyl)acetaldehyde-forming]. Other names in common use include octopamine hydrolyase, and octopamine hydro-lyase (deaminating).

References

 

EC 4.2.1
Enzymes of unknown structure